Kinect Sports Rivals (also known as Kinect Sports: Season Three) is a sports video game developed by Rare and published by Microsoft Studios for the Xbox One. It is the third game in the Kinect Sports series and utilizes the console's Kinect motion-sensing camera. The game was announced during Microsoft's E3 2013 press event and was released on April 8, 2014.

Gameplay 

The game features sports such as bowling, jetski racing, rock climbing, soccer, target shooting, and tennis.

Development 
The staff size for Kinect Sports Rivals was 150. Originally intended as an Xbox One launch title, the game was delayed from November 2013 to April 2014. Ex-Rare designer Gavin Price commented on the development of the game in 2015: "During Rivals' development, Kinect kind of got dropped quite suddenly. I think in part it was because we missed the launch date - I don't think that did us any favours! But we managed to get a jetski demo out for Xbox One's launch, and we had our cloud-based Avatar creation system with the facial recognition as well."

Reception 

The game received average review scores, getting scores of 7.3/10 from IGN, a 7/10 from the Official Xbox Magazine UK, and a 6/10 from Polygon. According to review aggregators GameRankings and Metacritic, the game received a mean review score of 64.18% and 60/100 respectively.

The game entered the UK all-formats sales charts at #14 and a source later indicated to Eurogamer that Rare suffered a significant loss on the project.

References

External links 
Kinect Sports Rivals at Rare

2014 video games
Association football video games
Bowling video games
Kinect games
Microsoft games
Multiplayer and single-player video games
Multiple-sport video games
Rare (company) games
Tennis video games
Video games scored by Robin Beanland
Water sports video games
Xbox One games
Xbox One-only games
Video games developed in the United Kingdom